Zafir Hadžimanov (Macedonian: Зафир Хаџиманов; 25 December 1943 – 27 March 2021) was a Macedonian and Serbian  singer, composer and actor who spent most of his adult life in Belgrade.

Biography
He was married to singer and actress Senka Veletanlić, with whom he has a son, Vasil Hadžimanov, a widely known jazz musician.

Hadžimanov died from complications caused by COVID-19 on 27 March 2021, at the age of 77.

References 

1943 births
2021 deaths
People from Kavadarci
Macedonians of Serbia
Macedonian film actors
Serbian film actors
20th-century Macedonian male singers
20th-century Serbian male singers
Macedonian composers
Serbian composers
Deaths from the COVID-19 pandemic in Serbia
Yugoslav male singers